Cândido Joaquim Venda Moreira Barbosa (born December 31, 1974 in Rebordosa, Portugal) is a former professional road racing cyclist from 1995 to 2010, where he decided to end his career as a professional road racing cyclist due to a serious injury on both of his knees.

Major results 

1995
 Volta ao Algarve
1st Stages 3 & 6
1996
 Volta ao Algarve
1st Stages 1 & 2
1997
1st Overall Volta ao Algarve
1st Stages 1, 2, 3, 4, 5 & 6
1st Porto–Lisboa
1999
 Volta ao Algarve
1st Stages 1 & 2
2001
1st Stage 4 Volta a Portugal
2002
1st Overall Volta ao Algarve
1st Stages 3 & 4
 Volta a Portugal
1st Stages 3 & 6
2003
1st Stage 3 Volta ao Algarve
 Volta a Portugal
1st Stages 1, 4, 7 & 8
2004
1st Overall GP CTT Correios de Portugal
1st Stages 1 & 3
1st Stage 2 Volta ao Algarve
2nd Overall Volta a Portugal
1st Stage 2
2005
1st  Time trial, National Road Championships
1st Overall Volta ao Distrito de Santarém
1st Stage 1
1st Troféu Sergio Paulinho
1st Stage 3 GP Internacional Paredes Rota dos Móveis
1st Stage 3 Volta ao Alentejo
2nd Overall Volta a Portugal
1st Stages 2, 6 & 7
2006
1st Stage 1 Volta a Portugal
2007
1st  Road race, National Road Championships
1st Stage 2 GP Internacional Paredes Rota dos Móveis
2nd Overall Volta a Portugal
1st Stages 3, 4, 5 & 8
2008
 Volta a Portugal
1st Stages 6 & 8
2009
 Volta ao Alentejo
1st Stages 4 & 5
 GP Internacional Paredes Rota dos Móveis
1st Stages 2 & 3
2010
1st Stage 10 Volta a Portugal

External links
 
 
 
 
 
 
 https://web.archive.org/web/20120128164801/http://candido-barbosa.com/noticias.php

Portuguese male cyclists
1974 births
Living people
Olympic cyclists of Portugal
Cyclists at the 1996 Summer Olympics
Cyclists at the 2004 Summer Olympics